The Modern Equality Party is a centre-left political party in Azerbaijan.

Its candidate Hafiz Haciyev won 0.3% of the popular vote in the 15 October 2003 presidential elections. During a live debate on TV, Haciyev clashed with Fuad Mustafayev, a representative of the
Azerbaijani Popular Front Party who threw his full water glass into Haciyev's face, the latter reacted throwing his water glass against Mustafayev.

In one occasion Haciyev accused Musavat leader Isa Gambar of being a KGB agent, ANIP leader Etibar Mamedov of collaborating with Armenians, and Popular Front leader Ali Kerimli of "losing his manhood" while in jail.

Elections were held on October 15, 2008, in which Ilham Aliyev won with 88.6% of the vote. None of the opposition parties, including the Modern Equality Party garnered more than 3% of the vote. Hafiz Hajiyev of Modern Equality received 0.65% of the vote.

In 2013 Hafiz Haciyev, leader of the party, offered a reward of 10,000 manats ($12,700) for the ear of novelist Akram Aylisli. The Interior Ministry said they would investigate the statement by Haciyev, who is pro-government. Human Rights Watch condemned the threat.

On 11 April  2018 presidential elections were held in Azerbaijan. Eight candidates participated, but it was clear from the outset that the incumbent president Ilham Aliyev of the New Azerbaijan Party would win. The following chart displays the results of the election:

References

2003 establishments in Azerbaijan
Azerbaijani democracy movements
Liberal parties in Azerbaijan
Political parties established in 2003
Political parties in Azerbaijan
Social liberal parties